Anton Vladimirovich Shipulin (born 21 August 1987) is a retired Russian biathlete and politician serving as the member of the State Duma since 2019.

Sport career
Absolute champion of European Biathlon Championship 2008 (juniors), he was the best Russian biathlon marksman in the same season (2009/2010). Shipulin won the bronze medal as part of the Russian men's relay team at the 2010 Winter Olympics. In the aftermath of the competition, he was awarded an order For Merit to the Fatherland by the Russian president.

Together with Evgeny Ustyugov, Alexey Volkov and Dmitry Malyshko he won the gold medal in the men's relay at the 2014 Winter Olympics, in Sochi, Russia.

His sister Anastasiya Kuzmina, (Slovak biathlete), is the Olympic champion in the 7.5 km sprint at the 2010 Winter Olympics in Vancouver, Canada, and at the 2014 Winter Olympics in Sochi, Russia and also Olympic champion in the 12.5 km mass start event from 2018 Winter Olympics in Pyeongchang, South Korea.

On 25 December 2018, Shipulin announced his retirement from sports after the World Team Challenge (Christmas Race).

Biathlon results
All results are sourced from the International Biathlon Union.

Olympic Games

* The mixed relay was added as an event in 2014.

World Championships
7 medals (1 gold, 3 silver, 3 bronze)

*During Olympic seasons competitions are only held for those events not included in the Olympic program.

Junior/Youth World Championships
6 medals (4 gold, 2 silver)

World Cup

Individual victories
11 victories (1 In, 4 Sp, 5 Pu, 1 MS)

*Results are from UIPMB and IBU races which include the Biathlon World Cup, Biathlon World Championships and the Winter Olympic Games.

Politic career
In January 2019, Shipulin announced that he would be a candidate for the United Russia nomination in the 2019 State Duma by-election in Serov constituency. In the primary on 26 May, Shipulin defeated 5 other candidates, scored 78.13% and won nomination from United Russia. In the by-election on 8 September, Shipulin won, gaining 41.59%.

References

External links

Profile on biathlonworld.com
Anton Shipulin, Biathlon’s driven relay man

1987 births
Living people
People from Tyumen
Russian male biathletes
Biathletes at the 2010 Winter Olympics
Biathletes at the 2014 Winter Olympics
Olympic biathletes of Russia
Medalists at the 2010 Winter Olympics
Medalists at the 2014 Winter Olympics
Olympic medalists in biathlon
Olympic bronze medalists for Russia
Olympic gold medalists for Russia
Biathlon World Championships medalists
United Russia politicians
Russian sportsperson-politicians
Seventh convocation members of the State Duma (Russian Federation)
Eighth convocation members of the State Duma (Russian Federation)